Lists of schools in the Toronto District School Board include:

List of Toronto District School Board elementary schools
List of secondary schools in the Toronto District School Board